Fleurs Aerodrome was a parent aerodrome built on behalf of the Royal Australian Air Force during World War II. It is located at Kemps Creek 40 km west of Sydney, Australia

Construction started on the aerodrome in 1942 and was still under construction in 1944 as part of a proposal to base a United States Navy Fleet Air Wing in Sydney should the need arise. Initially planned with three runways, No.1 (5000 ft) and No. 3 (6000 ft) runways were serviceable, however construction of No. 2 runway (5000 ft) was abandoned. A total of eight aircraft dispersal hideouts were constructed and accommodation was a farm house and a former Civil Constructional Corps camp.

In 1969, Fleurs was considered as a site of a second airport for Sydney to operate scheduled passenger flights, which were only done by one other airport in the city, Kingsford Smith. The aerodrome is now utilised as precision ground-reflection antenna range operated by the University of Sydney, known as the Fleurs Radio Observatory.

Satellite aerodromes
Wallgrove Aerodrome
Bringelly Aerodrome
Ravenswood Aerodrome (planned but not constructed)
Mittagong Aerodrome
Bargo Aerodrome
Tuggerah Aerodrome

See also
List of airports in Greater Sydney
List of airports in New South Wales

References
RAAF Mittagong NSW – aerodrome – landing ground (electronic copy) pp 17 -18

External links

Former Royal Australian Air Force bases
Military history of Sydney during World War II
Defunct airports in Greater Sydney